The term dither fish refers to an arbitrary group of aquarium fish, commonly used by aquarists, to help reduce innate timidity and aggression as well as to promote normal social behaviour in the other fish housed within the same aquarium. Dither fish help reduce anxiety of some nervous species of fish by allowing the fearful species to see that it is safe to leave cover and eat the food that has been given to them. Commonly used dither fish are typical schooling species, such as some Danio, barb and tetra species, and are most often used in cichlid tanks. Dither fish are typically fish that swim around the top of a tank, a behavior that reassures more timid fish that no predators are nearby, and are found naturally in the same habitat as the other fish in the aquarium, thereby encouraging them to relax and engage in normal behaviour. This technique relies on the ability of cichlids in an aquarium to gauge environmental security by observing the behaviour of other fish species.

References 

Fishkeeping